The Misinchinka River is a river in the north-central Interior of British Columbia, Canada, rising in the northern Hart Ranges to flow northwest to join the Parsnip River just before that river's estuary into the Parsnip Reach of Lake Williston, part of the Peace-Mackenzie Rivers drainage.

Tributaries 

 Atunatche Creek
Bijoux Creek
Caswell Creek
Honeymoon Creek
Hungry Moose Creek
Old Friend Creek
Rolston Creek
Stack Creek
Trappers Creek

References

Rivers of the Canadian Rockies
Northern Interior of British Columbia
Rivers of British Columbia
Cariboo Land District